James Oyebola (10 June 1961 – 27 July 2007) was a Nigerian and British heavyweight boxer who won a bronze medal at the 1986 Commonwealth Games in the super heavyweight division. Oyebola was the British heavyweight champion from 1994 to 1996.

Oyebola was born in Lagos, Nigeria. Standing 6 ft 10 in (2.08 m) tall, with a reach of 85 inches (2.16 m), he fought in the orthodox stance and won 18 of his 23 fights, 16 by knock out, losing four and drawing one.
He was pronounced brain dead after injuries sustained by gunshot wounds to his head after a nightclub altercation. He was based in Paddington during his career.

Amateur career
Oyebola was the ABA Super Heavyweight Champion in 1986 and 1987.

Pro career
Oyebola won the WBC International Heavyweight title in 1993 and the vacant British Heavyweight title on 19 November 1994 at the National Ice Rink, Cardiff, Wales when he knocked out Clifton Mitchell in 4 rounds.  His last fight, in 1996, was a defeat to Julius Francis.  He was nicknamed "Big Bad" during his career.

Personal life
Oyebola fathered two children by Malin Bergstrom, both born in Westminster, London: Kristel Regina Oyebola (born 1994) and James Babatunde Oyebola (born 1999).

Murder
Oyebola was shot in the back of the neck and leg in the early hours of 23 July 2007 after an altercation in the Chateau 6 club at Fulham Broadway where he was visiting a friend for a drink. He had gone to assist staff asking four customers in the rear courtyard to put out their cigarettes to observe the recently imposed smoking ban and was shot as they left the premises.

Simon Block, general secretary of the British Boxing Board of Control, paid the following tribute: "Throughout that time he was truly one of nature's gentlemen and to think of him lying in a hospital bed fighting for his life as a result of a cowardly and gutless attack by those who will not have been possessed of the same courage that he showed in the way he faced adversity, in and out of the ring, fills me with both sadness and dismay."

Oyebola's family decided that they would turn off his life support machine on 27 July 2007 at 11:30 am (10:30 GMT) after he was pronounced brain dead on 26 July 2007. It was announced at 12:39 pm on 27 July 2007 that James Oyebola had died, at Charing Cross Hospital, after his life support machine had been switched off. His funeral was held on 10 September 2007.

Aftermath
Four men were charged with Oyebola's murder, but charges against two, Rene McKoy and Dean Francis, were dropped. Kanyanta Mubanga Mulenga (born 1985, Wandsworth, London) was convicted on 8 October 2008 of his murder and has been sentenced to 28 years in prison.

A fourth man, who can not be named for legal reasons, was expected to stand trial in 2009 for James' murder.

The Oyebola family have said they will establish a charity foundation in James Oyebola's name aimed at helping direct youngsters towards a brighter future.

Professional boxing record

| style="text-align:center;" colspan="8"|18 Wins (16 knockouts, 2 decisions), 4 Losses (4 knockouts), 1 Draws
|-  style="text-align:center; background:#e3e3e3;"
|  style="border-style:none none solid solid; "|Res.
|  style="border-style:none none solid solid; "|Record
|  style="border-style:none none solid solid; "|Opponent
|  style="border-style:none none solid solid; "|Type
|  style="border-style:none none solid solid; "|Rd.
|  style="border-style:none none solid solid; "|Date
|  style="border-style:none none solid solid; "|Location
|  style="border-style:none none solid solid; "|Notes
|- align=center
|Loss
|18–4-1
|align=left| Julius Francis
|
|
|
|align=left|
|align=left|
|- align=center
|Win
|18–3-1
|align=left| Scott Welch
|
|
|
|align=left|
|align=left|
|- align=center
|Win
|18–2-1
|align=left| Keith McMurray
|
|
|
|align=left| 
|align=left|
|- align=center
|Win
|17–2-1
|align=left| Clifton Mitchell
|
|
|
|align=left|
|align=left|
|- align=center
|Win
|16–2-1
|align=left| Scott Welch
|
|
|
|align=left|
|align=left| 
|- align=center
|Win
|15–2-1
|align=left| Ladislao Mijangos
|
|
|
|align=left|
|align=left|
|- align=center
|Win
|14–2-1
|align=left| Jimmy Bills
|
|
|
|align=left|
|align=left|
|- align=center
|Win
|13–2-1
|align=left| Roger McKenzie
|
|
|
|align=left|
|align=left| 
|- align=center
|Win
|12–2-1
|align=left| Denroy Bryan
|
|
|
|align=left|
|align=left| 
|- align=center
|Win
|11–2-1
|align=left| Bombaphani Bonyongo Destroyer
|
|
|
|align=left|
|align=left| 
|- align=center
|Win
|10–2-1
|align=left| Stan Campbell
|
|
|
|align=left|
|align=left|
|- align=center
|Loss
|9–2-1
|align=left| John Westgarth
|
|
|
|align=left|
|align=left|
|- align=center
|Win
|9–1-1
|align=left| Art Terry
|
|
|
|align=left|
|align=left|
|- align=center
|Win
|8–1-1
|align=left| John Westgarth
|
|
|
|align=left|
|align=left|
|- align=center
|Win
|7–1-1
|align=left| Everton Champion Christian
|
|
|
|align=left|
|align=left|
|- align=center
|Win
|6–1-1
|align=left| Dorcy Gaymon
|
|
|
|align=left|
|align=left|
|- align=center
|Win
|5–1-1
|align=left| Tee Lewis
|
|
|
|align=left|
|align=left|
|- align=center
|Draw
|4–1-1
|align=left| Andrew Gerrard
|
|
|
|align=left|
|align=left|
|- align=center
|Win
|4–1
|align=left| Denroy Bryan
|
|
|
|align=left|
|align=left|
|- align=center
|Loss
|3–1
|align=left| Mike Jones
|
|
|
|align=left|
|align=left|
|- align=center
|Win
|3–0
|align=left| Carl Timbrell
|
|
|
|align=left|
|align=left|
|- align=center
|Win
|2–0
|align=left| Ian Priest
|
|
|
|align=left|
|align=left|
|- align=center
|Win
|1–0
|align=left| Andrew Gerrard
|
|
|
|align=left|
|align=left|

See also
Boxing at the 1986 Commonwealth Games

References

External links

1961 births
2007 deaths
Boxers at the 1986 Commonwealth Games
British murder victims
Commonwealth Games bronze medallists for England
Deaths by firearm in London
Heavyweight boxers
Male murder victims
Nigerian expatriates in the United Kingdom
Nigerian male boxers
Sportspeople from Lagos
Yoruba sportspeople
People murdered in London
Nigerian emigrants to the United Kingdom
Black British sportspeople
England Boxing champions
British male boxers
Nigerian people murdered abroad
Commonwealth Games medallists in boxing
Medallists at the 1986 Commonwealth Games